Vexillum aequatoriense is a species of sea snail, a marine gastropod mollusk, in the family Costellariidae, the ribbed miters.

Distribution
This marine species occurs off Waigeo Island, Indonesia.

References

aequatoriense
Gastropods described in 2011